Lacey Edward Putney (June 27, 1928 – August 26, 2017) was an American politician. He was a member of the Virginia House of Delegates from January 1962 until January 2014, making him the longest-serving member in the history of the Virginia General Assembly and one of the longest-serving state legislators in American history. He represented a district centered around his hometown of Bedford for his entire career, and at various times represented parts of neighboring Bedford and Botetourt counties.

Putney, a lawyer from Bedford, was first elected as a Democrat in 1961. He left that party later in the decade and began running as an independent, although he caucused with the Republicans from 1998.

Putney announced in March 2013 that he would not run for reelection in 2013.

Acting Speaker
In June 2002 Republican House Speaker S. Vance Wilkins, Jr. resigned following revelations that he had paid a staffer to keep quiet about "unwanted sexual advances". Putney, then Chair of the Privileges and Elections committee, served as Acting Speaker until the following session in January 2003, when Republican William J. Howell was elected as Speaker.

Electoral history

2007 voting bills
As Chair of the Privileges and Elections Committee, Putney blocked numerous electoral reform bills, including the National Popular Vote Interstate Compact and bills to introduce Instant Runoff Voting on a test basis. He then chaired the powerful Appropriations Committee.

References

External links
 
 
 
 
 
 

1928 births
2017 deaths
Members of the Virginia House of Delegates
Virginia Democrats
Virginia Independents
Virginia Republicans
People from Bedford County, Virginia
Washington and Lee University School of Law alumni
Virginia lawyers
20th-century American lawyers
20th-century American politicians
21st-century American politicians